The case of the missing children of Pirmasens refers to the disappearance of three German children in 1960, 1964, and 1967 in Pirmasens, who were suspected to have been murdered by a serial killer.

Events 
In the years 1960, 1964, and 1967, two boys and a girl, aged between 8 and 10, disappeared. They were last seen near the area of Messeplatz in Pirmasens, Germany and all three abductions took place on a Friday. The children were never found, and the investigation went cold due to a lack of leads.

1973 investigations 
In 1973, a re-examination of the facts, in conjunction with offender profiling, brought new insights into the case. Following a checkout procedure, thousands of men in Pirmasens and the surrounding area were screened on the basis of suspicion. A then 42-year-old casual worker, who had known the boys well, became a preliminary suspect. He was often near the places where they later disappeared and led a "restless life." A son of a jeweler, he had been studying philosophy and psychology for a while, and in 1954 he began treatment for schizophrenia. He then lived in the wilderness in the forests around Pirmasens. During the 6-hour interrogations, he began to contradict himself, so his guilt was considered by investigators to be secured. Instead of an arrest warrant, the district court of Zweibrücken ordered that he be admitted to a hospital in October 1974. The man consistently denied involvement and was released following a trial in March 1976 at the district court of Zweibrücken. The admission to the asylum was also ruled to be against the presumption of innocence and unconstitutional since there was no evidence against the man.

Paperback entry for criminologists 
Ernst Fischer, The Police Chief of Pirmasens who led the investigations which started in 1973, described the cases in his book The Pocket Book for Criminalists (1978). The check-out process involved searching public records with personal information, and was a precursor to dragnet search.

See also
List of German serial killers
List of people who disappeared

Literature 
 Ernst Fischer: Vermißte Kinder in Pirmasens. In: Waldemar Burghard; Hans Werner Hamacher (Hrsg.): Taschenbuch für Kriminalisten Bd. 28, Hilden 1978, S. 145–182.
 Schablone X. In: Der Spiegel. Nr. 46, 1974, S. 66–70 (online – 11. November 1974). 
 Kleiner Mythos. In: Der Spiegel. Nr. 16, 1976, S. 62–66 (online – 12. April 1976). 
 Keine Leichen und kein Geständnis. In: Die Zeit, Nr. 11 vom 5. März 1976, online.
 Netz mit Löchern. In: Die Zeit, Nr. 16 vom 9. April 1976, online.
 Zehnjährige seit sechs Tagen vermißt. In: Hamburger Abendblatt, Nr. 213 vom 13. September 1967, Seite 24, online.

1960 crimes in Germany
1960 murders in Germany
1960s missing person cases
1964 murders in Germany
1967 murders in Germany
Missing German children
Pirmasens
Unidentified serial killers